Norman Means Wilkinson (October 26, 1908 – November 11, 1991) was an American politician. He was a member of the Arkansas House of Representatives, serving from 1933 to 1942. He was a member of the Democratic party.

References

1991 deaths
1908 births
20th-century American politicians
People from Greenwood, Arkansas
Speakers of the Arkansas House of Representatives
Democratic Party members of the Arkansas House of Representatives